Events from the year 1821 in China.

Incumbents
 Daoguang Emperor (1st year)

Events 
 Ruan Yuan, Governor General of Liangguang, expanded the Guangdong Gong Yuan examination hall to more than seven thousand six hundred examination cells

References 

 
China